Lindblom is a Swedish surname. Notable people with the surname include:

 Björn Lindblom (born 1934), Swedish phonetician
 Charles E. Lindblom (1917–2018), American political scientist
 Duran O'Hara Lindblom (born 1983), Swedish figure skater
 Erik Lindblom (1857–1928), Swedish-born American businessman
 Gerhard Lindblom (1887–1969), Swedish ethnographer
 Gunnel Lindblom (born 1931), Swedish actress
 Gustaf Lindblom (athlete) (1891–1960), Swedish athlete
 Jacob Axel Lindblom (1746–1819), Swedish scholar and archbishop of Uppsala
 Josh Lindblom (born 1987), American baseball player
 Karl Lindblom (1892–1969), Swedish athlete
 Per Lindblom, Norwegian chess master
 Louise Lindblom (born 1968), Swedish lichenologist
 Mattias Lindblom (born 1971), Swedish singer
Oskar Lindblom (born 1996), Swedish ice hockey player
 Robert Lindblom (1844–1907), Swedish-born American businessman

Swedish-language surnames